BBC Sound Effects No. 19: Doctor Who Sound Effects is a 1978 compilation of sound effects by the BBC Radiophonic Workshop from the BBC science fiction series Doctor Who. It was the first album in the BBC Sound Effects series to feature solely Radiophonic Workshop output and also the first commercial release of an album of the Doctor Who sound effects and atmospheres. The effects included came from throughout the show's history, covering both Brian Hodgson and Dick Mills' time recording effects for the programme. Effects that did not appear on the compilation included the TARDIS taking off and landing, sounds which are considered to be works of music by the BBC rather than mere effects. Each side of the record was re-released in the United States as a part of pair of picture disc compilations, which also included tracks from Doctor Who - The Music. It was remastered and re-released on 2 February 2012, by AudioGo. It was the first time the album had a CD release in the UK. AudioGo and Discovery Records then re-released the original vinyl LP on 21 April 2012 as part of Record Store Day.

Track listing

Release history

The incorrect title conundrum
The back of the vinyl slipcover list the incorrect or misspelt titles for the episodes in which the sound effects come from. Can be seen here on Zaranyzerak's Multimedia Chronicles.

References

External links
Album information

BBC Radiophonic Workshop albums
Sound Effects
1978 compilation albums
Sound effects albums
BBC Records compilation albums
BBC Records soundtracks